Sperm protein associated with the nucleus on the X chromosome A is a protein that in humans is encoded by the SPANXA1 gene.

"Temporally regulated transcription and translation of several testis-specific genes is required to initiate the series of molecular and morphological changes in the male germ cell lineage necessary for the formation of mature spermatozoa. This gene is a member of the SPANX family of cancer/testis-associated genes, which are located in a cluster on chromosome X. The SPANX genes encode differentially expressed testis-specific proteins that localize to various subcellular compartments. This particular gene maps to chromosome X in a head-to-head orientation with SPANX family member A2, which appears to be a duplication of the A1 locus. The protein encoded by this gene targets to the nucleus where it associates with nuclear vacuoles and the redundant nuclear envelope. Based on its association with these poorly characterized regions of the sperm nucleus, this protein provides a biochemical marker to study unique structures in  while attempting to further define its role in spermatogenesis."

References

Further reading